Ichthyapus keramanus is a species of snake eel native to the western Pacific Ocean where it is only known to occur around the Kerama Islands near Okinawa, Japan. This species can reach a length of  TL. This species is placed in the genus Ichthyapus.

References

Ophichthidae
Fish described in 1997